Pascale Cossart (born 21 March 1948) is a French bacteriologist who is affiliated with the Pasteur Institute of Paris. She is the foremost authority on Listeria monocytogenes, a deadly and common food-borne pathogen responsible for encephalitis, meningitis, bacteremia, gastroenteritis, and other diseases.

Biography 
Cossart earned a B.S. and M.S. from Lille University in 1968. She then earned an M.S. in chemistry from Georgetown University in 1971, and her Ph.D. in biochemistry at the Pasteur Institute and the University of Paris in 1977 (University Paris Diderot).  She completed her postdoctoral fellowship at the Pasteur Institute. She is currently a Professor and Head of the Unité des Interactions Bactéries Cellules at the Pasteur Institute. In 1998, she received the Richard Lounsbery Prize and the L'Oreal-UNESCO Award for Women in Science. She was awarded the Balzan Prize for Infectious Diseases: Basic and Clinical Aspects in 2013.

Works 
Cossart's research has focused on infection by intracellular bacteria, and in particular the infectious agent Listeria monocytogenes.

Listeria is a food-borne bacterial pathogen responsible for numerous illnesses and a mortality rate of 30%.  The bacteria is one of the best models of intracellular parasitism because it is particularly hardy, able to survive in a variety of cells, cross multiple host barriers, and spreads through ActA, the protein responsible for actin-based motility.  Cossart's work has shed light on the genetic and biochemical processes that make Listeria so effective and lethal, identifying the bsh gene; regulatory mechanisms such as an RNA thermosensor that control expression of the virulence genes such as bsh; and the ways in which Listeria enters cells and crosses physiological barriers such as the blood–brain barrier, the intestinal barrier, and the placental barrier.  The discovery by Cossart's lab of the interaction between L. monocytogenes''' protein, internalin, and its cell receptor, E-cadherin, was the first such study that successfully demonstrated the molecular mechanism that permits a bacterial agent to cross the placental barrier.

In 2009 Cossart published what she describes as the first "bacterial operon map"—the transcriptional program that regulates Listeria's behavior in different environmental conditions. By comparing the sequences of Listeria drawn from soil and drawn from the human gut, Cossart identified non-coding RNAs that contribute to Listeria's virulence, identified additional RNA repressors, and determined that riboswitches can act both downstream and upstream.

As part of her work she has also developed important biological tools, including a transgenic mouse that was the first animal model to overcome bacterial species-specificity.  The mouse carried a human version of a host cell membrane receptor that L. monocytogenes used to enter cells.

Significant publications
 Cellular Microbiology, 2nd Ed.  (textbook), edited by Pascale Cossart, Patrice Boquet, and Staffan Normark
 Science 1 June 2001
 Nature, 17 May 2009

 Awards, prizes, and honorary lectures 
 Carlos J. Finlay Prize for Microbiology (1995)
 Louis Rapkine Medal (1997)
 Richard Lounsbery Award (1998)
 Helena Rubenstein / UNESCO Award for Women in Science Leadership (1998)
Corresponding member, French Academy of Sciences (1999)
Nestle Prize "L’homme et sa nutrition", (2000)
 Louis Pasteur Gold Medal, Swedish Society of Medicine, (2000)
Howard Hughes Medical Institute, International Research Scholar, 2000–2005, 2005–2011, 2012–2017
Member, German Academy of Sciences Leopoldina (2001)
 Valade Prize, Fondation de France (2003)
 Margaret Pittman Lecture, National Institutes of Health (2003)
Member, American Academy of Microbiology (2004)
 GlaxoSmithKline International Member of the Year Award (2007)
 Descartes Prize (2007)
 ERC Advanced Grant Award (2008)
Member of the European Academy of Microbiology, (2009)
 President, Conseil Scientifique of the Pasteur Institute
 Member, French Conseil National de la Science
 Robert Koch Prize (2007)
 Louis-Jeantet Prize for Medicine (2008)
René DESCARTES Prize (2008) for collaborative transnational research, Brussels, (2008)
ERC Advanced Grant Award (2008–2014)(2015–2019)
 Foreign member, Royal Society of London (2010)
Robert Koch Medal of the Robert Koch Institute, Berlin, Germany, (2010)
Van Deenen Medal of the Institute of Biomembranes, Utrecht, The Nertherlands, (2011)
Helmotz International Fellow Award, Berlin, Germany, (2013)
 Balzan Prize (2013)
H.P.R. Seeliger Award, Wurzburg, Germany (2013)
Foreign Member of the National Academy of Medicine (NAM), USA (2014)
 FEBS/EMBO Women in Science Award (2014)[6]
Jürgen Manchot-Guest Professorship 2014, Düsseldorf, Germany, (2014)
Doctor honoris causa'' of the University of Birmingham, United Kingdom, (2015)
Associated member of the Académie Nationale de Pharmacie, Paris (2016)
 Ernst Jung Gold Medal for Medicine from the Jung Foundation (2017)
Prix René et Andrée Duquesne, Paris, France, (2018)
Heinrich Wieland Prize, Munich, Germany, (2018)
 FEMS Lwoff Award (2019)
Honorary Doctorate, Karolinska Institute, Stockholm, (2020)
Selman A. Waksman Award in Microbiology, NAS (2021), National Academy of Science, Washington, USA (to be announced)
Grand officier of the Legion of Honor in 2020 (commandeur in 2013, officier in 2007).
Commandeur of the Ordre national du Mérite in 2010.

References

External links
 

1948 births
Living people
French microbiologists
French biologists
L'Oréal-UNESCO Awards for Women in Science laureates
Richard-Lounsbery Award laureates
21st-century American women scientists
Howard Hughes Medical Investigators
Georgetown University Graduate School of Arts and Sciences alumni
French women biologists
Women microbiologists
Members of the French Academy of Sciences
Officiers of the Légion d'honneur
Foreign Members of the Royal Society
Commanders of the Ordre national du Mérite
Pasteur Institute
Members of the National Academy of Medicine
Foreign associates of the National Academy of Sciences
Members of the German Academy of Sciences Leopoldina